Olgierd Cecil Zienkiewicz  (18 May 1921 –  2 January 2009) was a British academic of Polish descent, mathematician, and civil engineer. He was born in Caterham, England. He was one of the early pioneers of the finite element method. Since his first paper in 1947 dealing with numerical approximation to the stress analysis of dams, he published nearly 600 papers and wrote or edited more than 25 books.

Early education
His school education took place in Poland, where his father was a judge of the Katowice district. He and his family moved to the UK due to World War II.
Zienkiewicz studied in the early 1940s at Imperial College London for an undergraduate BSc (Hons) degree in civil engineering which he obtained in 1943 with first class honours. Then, after being offered a scholarship, he stayed for two more years at Imperial College to carry out research on dams under the supervision of Professors Alfred Pippard and Sir Richard V. Southwell. He was awarded the PhD degree in 1945 with his thesis title "Classical theories of gravity dam design in the light of modern analytical methods".

Contributions to science
Zienkiewicz was notable for having recognized the general potential for using the finite element method to resolve problems in areas outside the area of solid mechanics. The idea behind finite elements design is to develop tools based in computational mechanics schemes that can be useful to designers, not solely for research purposes. His books on the Finite Element Method were the first to present the subject and to this day remain the standard reference texts. He also founded the first journal dealing with computational mechanics in 1968 (International Journal for Numerical Methods in Engineering), which is still the major journal for the field of Numerical Computations.

International recognition
The international range of Zienkiewicz' academic experiences has been geographically diverse. He became a lecturer at the Department of Engineering, University of Edinburgh, UK (1949–1957) before becoming Professor of Structural and Civil Engineering at Northwestern University, Illinois, USA (1957–1961). From 1961 to 1988 he was Head of the Department of Civil Engineering at Swansea University. He was latterly Professor Emeritus of this institution. Other teaching positions have included:
 International Centre for Numerical Methods in Engineering (CIMNE), Barcelona, Spain—Professor of Numerical Methods in Engineering
 Polytechnic University of Catalonia, Barcelona, Spain—UNESCO Chair of Numerical Methods in Engineering
 University of Texas, Austin—Joe C. Walter Chair of Engineering.

Honours
Zienkiewicz received over 30 honorary degrees from Ireland, Belgium, Norway, Sweden, China, Poland, Scotland, Wales, France, England, Italy, Portugal, Hungary and the United States.

He was elected to a number of learned societies, including:
 Royal Society
 Royal Academy of Engineering, 1979
 United States National Academy of Engineering (foreign member)
 Polish Academy of Science
 Italian National Academy of Sciences
 Chinese Academy of Sciences

He has been the recipient of many honours, awards, and medals. including
 Commander of the Order of the British Empire
 Royal Medal (Royal Society)
 Carl Friedrich Gauss Medal (West German Academy of Science)
 Nathan Newmark Medal (American Society of Civil Engineers)
 Newton Gauss Medal (International Association for Computational Mechanics)
 Gold Medal (Institution for Mathematics and its Applications)
 Gold Medal (Institution of Structural Engineers)
 Timoshenko Medal (American Society of Mechanical Engineers)
 Prince Philip Medal (Royal Academy of Engineering),
Zienkiewicz has been listed as an ISI Highly Cited Author in Engineering by the ISI Web of Knowledge, Thomson Scientific Company.

He was instrumental in setting up the  association of computational mechanics in engineering (ACME) for the United Kingdom in 1992 and was the honorary president for the association for the rest of his life.

The Institution of Civil Engineers awards a prize in his honour biennially. The Zienkiewicz Numerical Methods in Engineering Prize was instituted in 1998 following a donation by John Wiley & Sons Ltd to commemorate his work in Numerical Methods in Engineering.

References

Bibliography
 O. C. Zienkiewicz, As I Remember, Timoshenko Medal acceptance speech presented at the ASME applied mechanics annual dinner in 1998.
 Zienkiewicz, O. C. (1945), Classical theories of gravity dam design in the light of modern analytical methods. PhD Thesis, Imperial College, University of London.
 Imperial College Alumni, Professor Olgierd C. Zienkiewicz 
 Swansea University, College of Engineering, Professor Olgierd C. Zienkiewicz

See also
 Imperial College Civil & Environmental Engineering

IStructE Gold Medal winners
1921 births
2009 deaths
English people of Polish descent
Numerical analysts
Alumni of Imperial College London
Academics of Swansea University
Commanders of the Order of the British Empire
Foreign members of the Chinese Academy of Sciences
Members of the Polish Academy of Sciences
Fellows of the Royal Academy of Engineering
Fellows of the Royal Society
Royal Medal winners
People from Caterham
Academics of the University of Edinburgh
Northwestern University faculty
University of Texas at Austin faculty
Foreign associates of the National Academy of Engineering